A suicide truck bombing occurred on 28 October 2017 in Mogadishu, Somalia. Later that day there were two more explosions, one from a suicide bomber's explosive belt. These bombings killed at least 25 people and injured 30.

The suicide truck bomb was rammed into Nasahablod Two hotel in Mogadishu. Five armed militants subsequently stormed the building afterwards. A siege ensued and three attackers were killed and the other two arrested.

The Islamic militant group Al-Shabaab claimed responsibility for the attack, which occurred two weeks after they perpetrated the 14 October 2017 Mogadishu bombings.

References

2010s in Mogadishu
2017 in Somalia
2017 murders in Somalia
28 October 2017 attacks
21st-century mass murder in Somalia
28 October 2017
Attacks on buildings and structures in 2017
28 October 2017
Attacks on hotels in Africa
Islamic terrorist incidents in 2017
Mass murder in 2017
28 October 2017 attacks
October 2017 crimes in Africa
October 2017 events in Africa
Suicide bombings in 2017
28 October 2017 attacks
Suicide car and truck bombings in Somalia
Terrorist incidents in Somalia in 2017
Somali Civil War (2009–present)
Building bombings in Somalia
Hotel bombings